Events in the year 1945 in India.

Incumbents
 Emperor of India – George VI
 Viceroy of India –  Viscount Wavell

Events
 National income - 77,736 million
 Detailed Wavell Plan: In May, Wavell visited London and discussed his ideas with the British Government. These London talks resulted in the formulation of a definite plan of action, officially made public simultaneously on June 14, by L.S.
 18 August – Subhas Chandra Bose, one of the Indian Freedom movement leaders, presumed dead in a plane crash in Taiwan
 20 September – Mohandas Gandhi and Jawaharlal Nehru demand that British troops leave India, in vain.
 25 June – Muslim League and congress were invited to the Simla Conference
 29 November – Bajaj Auto comes into existence.
 All India Council for Technical Education is established

Law
International Monetary Fund and Bank Act

Births
17 January – Javed Akhtar, political activist, poet, lyricist and screenwriter.
13 February – Vinod Mehra, actor (died 1990).
17 March – Esther David, author, artist, and sculptor.
1 April – Ali Ahmed Aslam, chef (died 2022).
4 May – Narasimhan Ram, journalist.
20 May – Ibrahim Saeed, journalist, editor and scholar (died 2007).
26 May – Vilasrao Deshmukh, politician and former Chief Minister of Maharashtra. (died 2012).
1 July – Susham Bedi, novelist, poet, and short story writer.
2 July  S. A. Chandrasekhar, film director and father of Joseph Vijay.
21 July – Ziona, religious leader, head of the largest living family
24 July – Azim Premji, businessman.
November – Subrahmaniam Nagarajan, wheat pathologist.

Deaths
18 August – Subhas Chandra Bose, the most prominent leader of the Indian independence movement (born 1897).

References

 
India
 Years of the 20th century in India
 India in World War II